Holy Family High School may refer to one of the following schools:

Holy Family High School (Glendale, California) in Glendale, California
Holy Family High School (Broomfield, Colorado) in Broomfield, Colorado
Holy Family High School (Lindsay, Nebraska) in Lindsay, Nebraska
Holy Family High School (New Bedford, Massachusetts) in New Bedford, Massachusetts
Holy Family High School (Mumbai) in Mumbai, India
Holy Family Diocesan High School in Huntington, New York

See also 
Holy Family School (disambiguation)
Holy Family Catholic High School (disambiguation)
Holy Family (disambiguation)